Italy participated in the Eurovision Song Contest 2013. The Italian entry was selected through an internal selection with the artist being selected by a special committee from the participants of the Sanremo Music Festival 2013 and the song selection being carried out by the artist. Marco Mengoni represented Italy with the song "L'essenziale", which placed 7th and scored 126 points in the final.

Internal selection

Artist selection

On 24 January 2013, Italian broadcaster RAI confirmed that the performer that would represent Italy at the 2013 Eurovision Song Contest would be selected by a special committee from the competing artists at the Sanremo Music Festival 2013. The competition took place between 12–16 February 2013 with the winner being selected on the last day of the festival. The competing artists in the "Big Artists" and "Newcomers" category were:

"Big Artists" category

Almamegretta
Annalisa Scarrone
Chiara 
Daniele Silvestri
Elio e le Storie Tese
Malika Ayane
Marco Mengoni
Maria Nazionale
Marta sui Tubi
Max Gazzè
Modà
Raphael Gualazzi
Simona Molinari and Peter Cincotti
Simone Cristicchi

"Newcomers" category 

Andrea Nardinocchi
Antonio Maggio
Blastema
Il Cile
Ilaria Porceddu
Irene Ghiotto
Paolo Simoni
Renzo Rubino

During the final evening of the Sanremo Music Festival 2013, Marco Mengoni was announced as the artist that would represent Italy at the Eurovision Song Contest 2013. Mengoni was also selected as the winner of the festival with the song "L'essenziale".

Song selection
On 18 March 2013, RAI confirmed that Marco Mengoni would perform his Sanremo Music Festival 2013 winning song "L'essenziale" at the Eurovision Song Contest 2013.

At Eurovision

As a member of the "Big Five", Italy automatically qualified for a place in the final, to be held on 18 May 2013. In addition to their participation in the final, Italy was assigned to vote in the first semi-final on 14 May 2013.

During the Italian delegation's press conference on 15 May, Italy was allocated to perform in the second half of the final. In the final, the producers of the show decided that Italy would perform 23rd, following Ukraine and preceding Norway. Italy placed 7th in the final and scored 126 points.

In Italy, only the first semi-final was aired on Rai 5, commentated by Federica Gentile, while the final was aired on Rai 2 and Rai HD, with commentary by Filippo Solibello, Marco Ardemagni and Natascha Lusenti.

The national jury that provided 50% of the Italian vote in the first semi-final and the final consisted of five journalists: Paolo Giordano, Gianni Sibilla, Luca Dondoni, Fabrizio Basso and Luigi Bolognini. The Italian spokesperson in the grand final was Federica Gentile.

Voting

Points awarded to Italy

Points awarded by Italy

References

External links

Sanremo 2013 – Official site

2013
Countries in the Eurovision Song Contest 2013
Eurovision
Eurovision